The 1984 WNBL season (Women's National Basketball League) was the fourth season of competition since its establishment in 1981. A total of 11 teams contested the league.

Ladder

Finals

1984 WNBL Awards

References

1984
1984 in Australian basketball
Aus
basketball